Mett, also known as Hackepeter (Northern Germany, Eastern Germany, Bavaria and Berlin) is a preparation of minced raw pork seasoned with salt and black pepper that is popular in Germany and Poland. It is frequently spread on halves of a bread roll, with raw onion optionally on top. Since the 1950s mett has also been offered as a buffet dish decoratively formed into the shape of a hedgehog, with raw onion "spines". German law forbids mett being sold with a fat content exceeding 35%.

Description
The name is derived from Low German mett for "chopped pork meat without bacon", or Old Saxon meti for "food". It consists of minced pork meat, generally seasoned with salt and black pepper, regionally also with garlic or caraway, and eaten raw. It is also possible to add chopped onion, in which case and it is known as Zwiebelmett (onion ). Legally, German  is not allowed to contain more than 35% fat. Unless pre-packaged, the German Lebensmittelhygiene-Verordnung ("food hygiene/health directive") permits mett to be sold only on the day of production. Mett is similar to tartare, a preparation of minced raw beef.

Varieties
Schinkenmett ("ham mett"), prepared from the upper thigh (ham), is considered especially fine.

In contrast to the normally available locally minced mett, coarse pork mett (Grobes Schweinemett) is produced in an industrial meat grinder. To preserve its structure, the pork meat is normally processed in a semi-frozen state.

Serving styles

Mett is normally eaten on a bread roll (Mettbrötchen) or sliced bread, frequently with a garnish of raw onion rings or diced raw onion. 

At buffets, mett is occasionally served as a Mettigel (Mett hedgehog, also Hackepeterigel or Hackepeterschwein). This form of serving mett has been popular since the 1950s. To serve it, a large amount of mett is shaped as a hedgehog, quartered onion rings or pretzel sticks are used as spikes, olives as eyes and nose.

Mett may also be offered in sausage form (German:mettwurst).

In parts of Southern Germany mett (Mettstange) can be served on a lye bun instead of a regular bun.

In southern Brazil, influenced by German immigrants, it is known as Hackepeter or Carne de Onça in Curitiba where this dish is very common and served covered with chives. This variation, however is made of raw beef, not pork.

In Wisconsin, The "cannibal sandwich" or "wildcat" (seasoned raw beef and sliced onions on rye bread) is sometimes consumed during holidays or family gatherings. Midwest historians typically agree that the continuing culinary practice is a result of 19th century German immigration to the area.

See also

 Basashi
 Çiğ köfte
 Crudos
 Kibbeh nayyeh
 Kitfo
 List of pork dishes
 List of meat dishes
 Steak tartare
 Sushi

References

External links

 Official definition of mett (in German)
 Video of person eating mett

German cuisine
Polish cuisine
Brazilian cuisine
Cuisine of Wisconsin
Pork dishes
Uncooked meat dishes